The Peter and Paul Fortress is the original citadel of St. Petersburg, Russia, founded by Peter the Great in 1703 and built to Domenico Trezzini's designs from 1706 to 1740 as a star fortress. Between the first half of the 1700s and early 1920s it served as a prison for political criminals. It has been a museum since 1924.

Today it has been adapted as the central and most important part of the State Museum of Saint Petersburg History. The museum has gradually become virtually the sole owner of the fortress building, except the structure occupied by the Saint Petersburg Mint (Monetniy Dvor).

History

From foundation until 1917

The fortress was established by Peter the Great on May 16 (Old Style; henceforth "(O.S.)"; May 27 by the Gregorian Calendar) 1703 on small Hare Island by the north bank of the Neva River, the last upstream island of the Neva delta. 

From around 1720, the fort served as a base for the city garrison and also as a prison for high-ranking or political prisoners. The Trubetskoy Bastion, rebuilt in the 1870s, became the main prison block. The first person to escape from the fortress prison was the anarchist Prince Peter Kropotkin in 1876.

Russian Revolution and beyond

During the February Revolution of 1917, it was attacked by mutinous soldiers of the Pavlovsky Regiment on February 27 (O.S.) and the prisoners were freed. Under the Provisional Government, hundreds of Tsarist officials were held in the Fortress.

The Tsar was threatened with being incarcerated at the Fortress on his return from Mogilev to Tsarskoe Selo on March 8 (O.S.); but he was placed under house arrest. On July 4 (O.S.) during the July Days demonstrations, the Fortress garrison of 8,000 men declared for the Bolsheviks. They surrendered to government forces without a struggle on July 6 (O.S.).

On October 25 (O.S.), the fortress quickly fell into Bolshevik hands. Following the ultimatum from the Petrograd Soviet to the Provisional Government ministers in the Winter Palace, after the blank salvo of the Cruiser Aurora at 21.00, the guns of the Fortress fired 30 or so shells at the Winter Palace. Just two hit, inflicting only minor damage, and the defenders refused to surrender at that time. At 02.10 on the morning of October 26 (O.S.), the Winter Palace was taken by forces under Vladimir Antonov-Ovseenko; the captured ministers were taken to the Fortress as prisoners. On 28 January 1919, four Grand Dukes from the House of Romanov were shot within the walls of the fortress on the orders of the Presidium of the Cheka under Felix Dzerzhinsky, Yakov Peters, Martin Latsis, and Ivan Ksenofontov.

In 1924, most of the site was converted to a museum. In 1931, the Gas Dynamics Laboratory was added to the site. The structure suffered heavy damage during the bombardment of the city during World War II by the Luftwaffe who were laying siege to the city. It has been faithfully restored post-war and is a prime tourist attraction.

Public perception

In the years before and after the 1917 Bolshevik Revolution, Peter and Paul Fortress was portrayed by Bolshevik propaganda as a hellish, torturous place, where thousands of prisoners suffered endlessly in filthy, cramped, and grossly overcrowded dungeons amid frequent torture and malnutrition. Such legends had the effect of turning the prison into a symbol of government oppression in the minds of the common folk. In reality, conditions in the fortress were far less brutal than believed; no more than one hundred prisoners were ever kept in the prison at a time, and most prisoners had access to such luxuries as tobacco, writing paper, and literature (including subversive books such as Karl Marx's Das Kapital).

Despite their ultimate falsehood, stories about the prison were vital to the spread of Bolshevik revolutionary sentiment. The legends served to portray the government as cruel and indiscriminate in the administration of justice, helping to turn the common mind against Tsarist rule. Many inmates, after being released, wrote chilling and increasingly exaggerated accounts of life there that solidified the structure's horrible image in the public mind and pushed the people further towards dissent. Writers often purposely exaggerated their experiences to garner more hatred for the government; as writer and former Peter and Paul inmate Maksim Gorky would later state, "Every Russian who had ever sat in jail as a 'political' prisoner considered it his holy duty to bestow on Russia his memoirs of how he had suffered."

Sights
The fortress contains several notable buildings clustered around the Peter and Paul Cathedral (1712–1733), which has a  bell-tower (the tallest in the city centre) and a gilded angel-topped cupola.

Other structures inside the fortress include the still functioning Saint Petersburg Mint building (constructed to Antonio Porta's designs under Emperor Paul), the Trubetskoy Bastion with its grim prison cells, and the city museum.

Midday Cannon Shot

During the time of Peter the Great, a shot from the cannon of the Peter and Paul Fortress was heard in honor of military victories, on holidays, and also to warn residents about the rise in the water level of the Neva. Initially, the cannon stood on the «Gosudarev» bastion, but later it was moved to the «Naryshkin» bastion. 

Since 1873, a new tradition has appeared in St. Petersburg - a shot from a cannon at exactly noon. Residents of the city even checked their watches by the shot. The gun was silent only in times of revolutions and wars. However, nowadays the gunshot can be heard every day at 12 noon.

References

External links

Official webpage 
Official site of museum complex
Satellite photo, via Google Maps
Useful information about the Peter and Paul Fortress, read on the website tour-planet.com reviews written by real travelers
Peter & Paul Fortress at www.spb-city.com
The Association of Castles and Museums around the Baltic Sea
Useful information about the Peter and Paul Fortress 

Peter and Paul Fortress
1703 establishments in Russia
Forts in Russia
Defunct prisons in Russia
Prison museums in Russia
Buildings and structures in Saint Petersburg
Tourist attractions in Saint Petersburg
Domenico Trezzini buildings and structures
Local history museums in Russia
Military and war museums in Saint Petersburg
History museums in Saint Petersburg
Cultural heritage monuments of federal significance in Saint Petersburg
Time guns